Higashi Otani, or Ōtani Mausoleum (Ōtani Sobyo), is a cemetery and mausoleum in Kyoto, Japan.

References

External links
 
 Higashi-Ōtani at Lonely Planet
 

Cemeteries in Japan
Mausoleums in Japan
Tourist attractions in Kyoto